Pleasure and Pain is the seventh album from the country rock band Dr. Hook & The Medicine Show.  It featured two U.S. Top 10 hits, "Sharing the Night Together" and "When You're in Love with a Beautiful Woman."  Both songs also became chart hits in the UK, Canada and Australia.

This particular Dr. Hook album was pressed with two different track line-ups. The first pressing, whose track listing is below, didn't include the song "All the Time in the World", as subsequent re-pressings did.

Track list
"Sharing the Night Together" (Ava Aldridge, Eddie Struzick) – 2:58
"Sweetest of All" (Shel Silverstein) – 2:42
"Storms Never Last" (Jessi Colter) – 3:25
"I Don't Want to Be Alone Tonight" (Silverstein) – 3:30
"Knowing She's There" (Silverstein, Dennis Locorriere) – 3:26
"Clyde" (J. J. Cale) – 4:38
"When You're in Love with a Beautiful Woman" (Even Stevens) – 3:02
"Dooley Jones" (Hazel Smith, Walter Carter) – 3:48
"I Gave Her Comfort" (Silverstein, Locorriere) – 3:15
"You Make My Pants Want to Get up and Dance" (Sam Weedman) – 3:07

Personnel

Music
 Ray Sawyer – lead vocals
 Dennis Locorriere – lead guitar, lead vocals, bass, harmonica
 Rik Elswit – rhythm guitar, vocals
 Billy Francis – keyboards, backing vocals
 Jance Garfat – bass
 John Wolters - drums, percussion, vocals
 Bob "Willard" Henke - guitar, keyboards, vocals
 Marilyn Martin - backing vocals
 Nancy Nash - backing vocals

Artwork By – Michael Kanarek

Charts

References

1978 albums
Dr. Hook & the Medicine Show albums
Capitol Records albums
Albums produced by Ron Haffkine
Albums recorded at Muscle Shoals Sound Studio